Hippana or Hyppana, was an ancient town of Sicily. It sat astride the main road from Panormus (modern Palermo) to Agrigentum (modern Agrigento) upon Monte dei Cavalli, in the modern comune of Prizzi. It is an important archaeological site in situated in a central position between the Tyrrhenian coast and the Mediterranean Sea, halfway between Palermo and Agrigentum.

It was mentioned by Polybius as being taken by assault by the Romans in the First Punic War, 260 BC.  Diodorus, in relating the events of the same campaign, mentions the capture of a town called "Sittana", for which we should in all probability read "Hippana".  The correctness of the name found in Polybius is confirmed by Stephanus of Byzantium (s. v.) who, however, writes it  but cites Polybius as his authority.  

Some manuscripts of Pliny mention the name of Ipanenses in his list of Sicilian towns where the older editions have Ichanenses.  If this reading be adopted, it in all probability refers to the same place as the Hippana of Polybius; but as the reading Ichanenses is also supported by the authority of Stephanus (who notices Ichana as a town of Sicily), the point must be considered doubtful.

Excavations in 2007 at Montagna dei Cavalli revealed a Greek theatre, one of the few known in Sicily and Magna Graecia. It dates to the second half of the 4th century BC and was destroyed in 258 BC, the year of the sacking of the city by the Romans in the first Punic war.

References

Ancient cities in Sicily
Ruins in Italy
Former populated places in Italy
Archaeological sites in Sicily